The  is a professional wrestling six-woman tag team championship owned by the World Wonder Ring Stardom promotion. The title was first announced during Stardom's year-end event on December 24, 2012, and two days later its name was revealed as the "Artist of Stardom Championship", with a four-team one night single-elimination tournament announced to determine the inaugural champions.

Title history

On January 14, 2013, Kawasaki Katsushika Saikyou Densetsu (Act Yasukawa, Natsuki☆Taiyo and Saki Kashima) defeated Team Shimmer (Kellie Skater, Portia Perez & Tomoka Nakagawa) in the finals of the tournament to become the inaugural champions.

Like most professional wrestling championships, the title is won as a result of a scripted match. There have been twenty-eight reigns shared among twenty-six teams and forty-six wrestlers. Prominence (Risa Sera, Suzu Suzuki & Hiragi Kurumi) are the current champions in their first reign, as well as individual.

Belt design
The championship belts were introduced on February 6, 2013, when they arrived to Stardom's office from their American maker "Top Rope Belts". The belts are rare among all other tag team championship belts in that they are all of different color; one is blue, one orange and one pink. There is no rule for the belt color distribution into the teams. Each title holder gets to choose her own belt colour freely. The biggest star-shaped plate is inscribed with "Three stars make the highest magic", while the three smaller star plates feature the words "high, art, bonds". These inscriptions depict the strong unity of the six-woman tag team which holds the championship.

Reigns
The inaugural championship team was Kawasaki Katsushika Saikyou Densetsu (Act Yasukawa, Natsuki☆Taiyo and Saki Kashima). The teams Stars (Mayu Iwatani, Saki Kashima and Tam Nakano) and Queen's Quest (AZM, HZK and Io Shirai) are tied with most reigns at two, while individually, Shirai has the most reigns at six. As a team, Cosmic Angels (Mina Shirakawa, Nakano and Unagi Sayaka) has the longest reign at 291, while AZM's, HZK's, and Shirai's first reign is the shortest at 21 days. Kyoko Kimura is the oldest champion at 39 years old, while AZM is the youngest at 14 years old.

Prominence (Hiragi Kurumi, Risa Sera and Suzu Suzuki) are the current champions in their first reign. They defeated Oedo Tai (Kashima, Momo Watanabe and Starlight Kid) at Dream Queendom 2 on December 29, 2022 in Tokyo, Japan

Combined reigns

By team

By wrestler

References

External links
World Wonder Ring Stardom's official website
Artist of Stardom Championship history at Wrestling-Titles.com

World Wonder Ring Stardom championships
Women's professional wrestling tag team championships
Trios wrestling tag team championships